Dianne Marie Willcocks CBE DL (born 5 May 1945) was the Vice-Chancellor of York St John University until retirement in April 2010 and is a former Deputy Principal of Sheffield Hallam University.

Biography
She received a Dip.M from Ealing College of Higher Education in 1966, and a BSc (Hons) in Human Sciences from the University of Surrey in 1976. 

Willcocks worked as Director of Research at the University of North London. She moved from London to Sheffield as Assistant Principal of Sheffield Hallam University. In 1999 she became the first Principal of Rip and York St John College in 160 years.

She was appointed Commander of the Order of the British Empire (CBE) in the 2008 Birthday Honours.

After retirement, Willcocks has continued her work in gerontology as Chair of the Wilf Ward Family Trust, as a Patron of Older Citizens Advocacy, York, and has served as Health Champion for York’s Older Person’s Assembly.

Other appointments
Below are a selection of Dianne Willcocks' other appointments.
 Chair of Trustees, York Theatre Royal
 Chair, Action on Access Advisory Forum
 Member of Executive Board, GuildHE
 Board Member, Aimhigher National Partnership
 Board Member, Yorkshire Film Archive
 Deputy Lieutenant, North Yorkshire
 Trustee, York Museums Trust
 Trustee, Higher Education Academy
Trustee, York Mediale.
 Deputy chair of the trustees of the Joseph Rowntree Foundation

Publications
Peace, S., Kellaher, L., and Willcocks, D. 1982.A Balanced Life?. Survey Research Unit, The Polytechnic of North London.
Willcocks, D., Peace, S. and Kellaher, L. 1986. Private lives in public places: a research-based critique of residential life in local authority old people's homes. London, Tavistock.
Kellaher, L., Peace, S., and Willcocks, D. 1990. "Triangulating data". In: Peace, Sheila M. (ed.) Researching Social Gerontology: Concepts, Methods and Issues. London, Sage. 115–128.
Peace, S., Kellaher, L., and Willcocks, D. 1997. Re-evaluating residential care. Buckingham, Open University Press.

References

Further reading

Living people
1945 births
Commanders of the Order of the British Empire
Alumni of the University of Surrey
Alumni of the University of West London
Academics of Sheffield Hallam University
Academics of the University of North London
Deputy Lieutenants of North Yorkshire
People associated with York St John University
British women academics
Women social scientists
Trustees of York Museums Trust